932 Hooveria (prov. designation:  or ) is a dark background asteroid, approximately  in diameter, located in the inner region of the asteroid belt. It was discovered by Austrian astronomer Johann Palisa at the Vienna Observatory on 23 March 1920. The carbonaceous C-type asteroid (Ch) has a long rotation period of 78.4 hours. It was named after then-Secretary of Commerce Herbert Hoover (1874–1964), who later became president of the United States.

Orbit and classification 

Hooveria is a non-family asteroid of the main belt's background population when applying the hierarchical clustering method to its proper orbital elements. It orbits the Sun in the inner asteroid belt at a distance of 2.2–2.6 AU once every 3 years and 9 months (1,375 days; semi-major axis of 2.42 AU). Its orbit has an eccentricity of 0.09 and an inclination of 8° with respect to the ecliptic. The body's observation arc begins with its official discovery observation at Vienna Observatory on 23 March 1920.

Naming 

This minor planet was named by the Academic Senate of the Vienna University in honor of then-Secretary of Commerce Herbert Hoover (1874–1964), in recognition of his help to Austria after World War I. The  was mentioned in the Astronomische Nachrichten in 1922 (AN 216, 192). Hoover became the 31st president of the United States from 1929 to 1933. A second asteroid 1363 Herberta was also named after him in 1938.

Another of Palisa's discoveries, asteroid 941 Murray, was also named in appreciation for the help provided to post-war Austria. In this case, it was named after British classical scholar and diplomat Gilbert Murray (1866–1957).

Physical characteristics 

In the Tholen classification, Hooveria is classified as a CB-asteroid, closest to a carbonaceous C-type and somewhat similar to a brighter B-type asteroid. In the Small Solar System Objects Spectroscopic Survey (S3OS2), the asteroid is a Caa-type in the survey's Tholen-like taxonomy, and a hydrated Ch-subtype in the SMASS-like taxonomy of the S3OS2.

Rotation period 

In December 2016, a rotational lightcurve of Hooveria was obtained from photometric observations by Anna Marciniak at the Poznań Observatory and other observers around the world during a survey, that collected spin and shape properties of long-period main-belt asteroids. Lightcurve analysis gave a well-defined rotation period of  hours with a brightness variation of  magnitude. The results supersede observations by Brian Warner at the Palmer Divide Observatory  and collaborators from February 2010, which gave a rotation period  hours (or half the period solution) with a brightness amplitude of  magnitude.

Diameter and albedo 

The Collaborative Asteroid Lightcurve Link assumes an albedo of 0.20 and calculates a diameter of 29.72 km based on an absolute magnitude of 10.00.

An asteroid occultation on 1 February 2006, gave a best-fit ellipse dimension of 33.0 × 33.0 kilometers. These timed observations are taken when the asteroid passes in front of a distant star. However the quality of the measurement is poorly rated.

Notes

References

External links 
 Lightcurve Database Query (LCDB), at www.minorplanet.info
 Dictionary of Minor Planet Names, Google books
 Discovery Circumstances: Numbered Minor Planets (1)-(5000) – Minor Planet Center
 
 

000932
Discoveries by Johann Palisa
Named minor planets
000932
19200323